Charles C. Lopez (born August 4, 1960 in Brooklyn, New York) is an American jockey in Thoroughbred horse racing. Recorded as "Charles," he is the son of jockey Carlos Lopez, Sr. His own sons, Erick and David Lopez, are also jockeys.

Lopez began his professional riding career at Keystone Racetrack in Bensalem Township, Pennsylvania where he got his first win aboard Foolish Tracy on January 15, 1979.  He was the leading rider at Meadowlands Racetrack in 1979 and 2003 and at Monmouth Park Racetrack in 1998.

References
 Chuck C. Lopez at the NTRA

Year-end charts

1960 births
American jockeys
Sportspeople from Brooklyn
Living people